Liu Liping (born June 1, 1958) is a former Chinese handball player. She competed in the 1984 Summer Olympics.

Liping was a member of the Chinese handball team, which won the bronze medal. She played all five matches and scored fourteen goals.

External links
profile

1958 births
Living people
Chinese female handball players
Handball players at the 1984 Summer Olympics
Olympic bronze medalists for China
Olympic handball players of China
Olympic medalists in handball
Medalists at the 1984 Summer Olympics
20th-century Chinese women